Le Cordon Bleu College of Culinary Arts Miami was a culinary arts school in Miramar, Florida. The college is owned by Career Education Corporation under a licensing agreement with Le Cordon Bleu in Paris.  The school offered a Diploma in Le Cordon Bleu Pâtisserie and Baking and an Associate of Science degree in Le Cordon Bleu Culinary Arts.  Students received training from experienced chefs and the programs were designed to help students prepare for culinary careers.

Established in September 2003, Le Cordon Bleu College of Culinary Arts Miami began offering classes to students in May 2004. It closed in 2017.

Academics 

Le Cordon Bleu College of Culinary Arts Miami offered two programs:

Le Cordon Bleu Culinary Arts Program
The college offered an Associate of Science degree in Le Cordon Bleu Culinary Arts. The program was designed to teach students French techniques and combine those with modern American technology.  Students also could learn classic cooking methods, nutrition, qualitative food preparation and sanitation.  Those in the program were taught by professional chef instructors and could gain hands-on experience in both the front and back of the house in the on-site restaurant.

Le Cordon Bleu Pâtisserie and Baking Program
The college also offered a Diploma in Le Cordon Bleu Pâtisserie and Baking.  The program taught students the fundamentals of baking and the theoretical knowledge needed to execute those skills.  The course work covered the baking and pastry skills that will be used in the baking field of the food service industry and were taught by professional chef instructors.

Accreditation 

Le Cordon Bleu College of Culinary Arts Miami was accredited by the Accrediting Commission of Career Schools and Colleges as a branch location of Le Cordon Bleu Institute of Culinary Arts in Pittsburgh.

References

External links 
Le Cordon Bleu - Miami

Le Cordon 
Cooking schools in the United States
Educational institutions established in 2003
Universities and colleges in Miami-Dade County, Florida
Career Education Corporation
Educational institutions disestablished in 2017
2003 establishments in Florida